Zerco or Zercon (410/420 in Mauretania - second half of the 5th century in Constantinople?) was a Moorish dwarf and the jester of the magistri militum Aspar and Aetius and of the Hunnic kings Bleda and Attila.

Life

In 432 the Byzantine general Aspar was sent to North Africa by emperor Theodosius II to support Bonifacius, the governor of the Diocese of Africa, against the Vandals, who he had previously summoned as mercenaries as he intended to revolt against the emperor; here Aspar purchased Zerco, a Moorish dwarf, as his personal jester.

In 442 the Huns, taking advantage of the Byzantine expedition against the Vandals, invaded Thracia, using as an excuse the fact that the bishop of Margus had desecrated the Hunnic royal tombs. Aspar was sent to negotiate, but he was forced to flee. Zerco was then captured by the Huns and became king Bleda's personal jester. Zerco always accompanied Bleda, who commissioned a special armour for him. On one occasion Zerco escaped, along with other prisoners. Bleda let the other prisoners go, but brought Zerco back. When asked about the reasons for his escape, Zerco told Bleda that he wanted to find a wife, so Bleda married him with one of the queen's handmaidens. Roughly 445, Bleda died. Zerco was inherited by Attila, who didn't like him at all, disgusted or maybe scared by his sight.

Some time after, Constantius, Attila's secretary, was crucified for appropriating the treasure of Sirmium, which the city bishop had given to him as a ransom for citizens captured during the invasion of Thrace. The treasure had been sold to Roman banker Silvanus. Attila asked for restitution. Aetius sent a delegation to Attila, saying he could not seize the treasure from Silvanus; instead, a monetary compensation was provided. On this occasion Aetius sent to Attila another man also called Constantius to be his new Latin-speaking secretary. It is most probably at this occasion that Zerco was transferred to Aetius as a gift from Attila. Aetius was the ultimate source of Zerco's vicissitudes, as it was Aetius who had pushed Boniface to revolt, instilling distrust between him and the emperess Galla Placidia. Soon after Aetius gave Zerco back to his original owner, Aspar.

In 449 Edeko, Attila's advisor and the future father of Odoacer, convinced Zerco to return to Attila's court and his wife. At that moment a Western Roman embassy, led by Romulus (maternal grandfather of the last Western Roman emperor Romulus Augustulus), Protromus and Romanus and a Byzantine embassy, led by the historian Priscus and Massiminus were visiting Attila's court. Zerco's request to travel with them back to Attila was, however, refused.

Priscus described Zerco as of Moorish race; because of the deformity of his body, his lisping and his appearance, he was a source of laughter. He was short, had shoulder humps, twisted feet and a flat nose revealed only by the two nostrils.

Nothing is known about Zerco's fate, although he probably spent his last years in Constantinople.

Quote

In popular culture
 Zercon is the protagonist of SDSS1416+13B (Zercon, A Flagpole Sitter), a composition by singer-songwriter Scott Walker. The 21-minute song appears on his 2012 album Bish Bosch, and follows the jester's attempts to escape the cruelty of Attila's court by ascending through history, eventually becoming the titular brown dwarf star and freezing to death.
 Zerco appears in Slave of the Huns by Géza Gárdonyi.
Zercon is portrayed by Mick Walter in the BBC docudrama series Heroes and Villains.

References

Further reading
 Priscus of Paion, Embassy to Attila
 Procopius of Cesarea, De Bello Vandalico, book I, chapter III
 Christopher Kelly, The End of Empire: Attila the Hun & the Fall of Rome, 2008

External links
https://web.archive.org/web/20010204040700/http://ccat.sas.upenn.edu/jod/texts/priscus.html

Jesters
Entertainers with dwarfism